Abel Bazán (23 December 1833 – 24 October 1903) was an Argentine politician and jurist.

Bazán was born in La Rioja, Argentina and studied law at the National University of Córdoba, gaining the title of doctor of jurisprudence. He became a politician in La Rioja Province, serving as minister of government under the governorship of Colonel Domingo Antonio Villafañe. He served in the Argentine Senate from 1864 until 1880 and served as deputy for the Province in the constituent convention of 1898.

It was as a judge that Bazán was most prominent. He worked as a judge in Santa Fe and Córdoba and in 1890 he was appointed to the Supreme Court of Argentina by President Miguel Juárez Celman. In 1903 President Julio Argentino Roca appointed Bazán as President of the Supreme Court.

Notes

1833 births
1903 deaths
Members of the Argentine Senate for La Rioja
Supreme Court of Argentina justices